Zanjan Airport  is an airport serving Zanjan, Iran.

Airlines and destinations

References

Airports in Iran
Zanjan County
Buildings and structures in Zanjan Province
Transportation in Zanjan Province